Gabriel Hamester Grando (born 29 March 2000), known as Gabriel Grando or Gabriel Chapecó, is a Brazilian professional footballer who plays as a goalkeeper for Grêmio.

Club career

Grêmio
Born in Chapecó, Brazil, Gabriel Grando joined the Grêmio's Academy at the age of 14 in 2014.

International career
Gabriel was called up to the Brazil national team for the first time in November 2021 for their 2022 FIFA World Cup  qualifiers.

Career statistics

Club

Honours
Grêmio
Campeonato Gaúcho: 2021, 2022
Recopa Gaúcha: 2021, 2022

References

External links

Profile at the Grêmio F.B.P.A. website

2000 births
Living people
People from Chapecó
Brazilian footballers
Association football goalkeepers
Grêmio Foot-Ball Porto Alegrense players
Campeonato Brasileiro Série A players
Sportspeople from Santa Catarina (state)